Mole blanco ("white mole") is a type of mole of the cuisine of Mexico. This type of thickened sauce is prepared with a mixture of the ingredients lightly roasted, including: peanuts without skin, skinless almonds, sunflower, pine nuts and white corn tortilla. The elements fried in oil are sliced banana, chopped apple, blonde raisins, sliced onion, pieces of chile güero and bits of habanero chile. These ingredients are then ground in a blender or in a molcajete, adding milk, white chocolate, and water or broth, along with seasoning items like garlic, cloves, allspice, cinnamon strips and anise. An aromatic mole is obtained, with mildish flavour.

See also
 List of sauces

External links 
 http://www.food.com/recipe/mole-blanco-white-mole-sauce-417838
 https://web.archive.org/web/20150519055349/http://cocinamestiza.com/productos/brides-mole/
 https://web.archive.org/web/20150518085856/http://cocinavital.mx/recetas/mole-blanco/

Mexican sauces